The Terry Park Ballfield (also known as the Park T. Pigott Memorial Stadium) is a historic site in Fort Myers, Florida, United States. The park is named after the family who donated the land in the 1920s. For years the stadium hosted Major League Baseball spring training, as well as a dozen years of Florida State League baseball. The stadium hosted the Philadelphia Athletics, Cleveland Indians, Pittsburgh Pirates, and Kansas City Royals spring training through the years. Terry Park was also home to some early minor league baseball, most notably the Fort Myers Palms and Fort Myers Royals, both belonging to the Florida State League. Hall of Famers Babe Ruth, Ty Cobb, Roberto Clemente, Jimmy Foxx, Bob Feller, Tris Speaker, and George Brett are some of the notable players who have played at Terry Park Field.

History 
Amidst bulls and heifers, a small wooden grandstand seating no more than 600 fans was erected on the site about a mile east of downtown Fort Myers. The stadium was built as a spring training ballpark for Connie Mack's Philadelphia Athletics in 1925. The park was the spring training home of the Philadelphia Athletics from 1925 until , and the Cleveland Indians from 1940 until 1942. It was also the home of the minor league Fort Myers Palms in 1926. The stadium remained in its 1925 condition until 1943, when it was destroyed in a fire. However, in 1955 the park was rebuilt. This time, instead of wood, the stadium was made from steel and concrete.

Pittsburgh Pirates era
The rebuilt Terry Park created an alliance between Fort Myers and the Pittsburgh Pirates. For years the Pirates wandered all over the country for a spring training location and were looking for a permanent spring training home. During a 12-year period the Pirates spent spring training in seven different locations: McCulloch Park in Muncie, Indiana; Flamingo Field in Miami Beach, Gilmore Field in Hollywood, California; Perris Hill Park in San Bernardino; Gran Stadium in Havana, Cuba; and Jaycee Park in Fort Pierce.

Kansas City Royals era 
In 1968 the Kansas City Athletics moved from Kansas City, Missouri to Oakland, California.  This change allowed Kansas City to receive a Major League expansion team. They received their team which was called the Kansas City Royals. Terry Field became the new spring training home for the team. The team's historic first exhibition game was played at Terry Field against the Montreal Expos. The Royals would remain in Fort Myers until . During the Kansas City Royals years, the field featured artificial turf, similar to that of Royals Stadium. However several years after the Royals left for Baseball City, the turf left as well.

In  the Royals left Fort Myers for Haines City. The City open offered the team a new stadium and opened up a theme park called Boardwalk and Baseball which was centered around a baseball theme. 
The main attraction was going to be the Kansas City Royals spring training home, however the deal later proved to be a bust and by 2002 the park was abandoned and later completely demolished.

Fort Myers Royals
In  the Kansas City Royals brought a minor league affiliate to Fort Myers, the team being called the Fort Myers Royals a Single A Florida State League franchise. The team played at Terry Field from 1978 until 1987. In 1985 the Royals won the Florida League Championship. Kevin Seitzer and Bret Saberhagen were members of the Fort Myers team and began their professional careers at Terry Park.

End of professional baseball
After the Royals left Fort Myers, a new spring training team was never fielded at the stadium. Two new stadiums were built in Fort Myers, Hammond Stadium was built for the Minnesota Twins and City of Palms Park was built for the Boston Red Sox. The last professional baseball team to call Terry Park home was the Fort Myers Sun Sox of the short lived Senior Professional Baseball Association in 1989 and 1990. The league featured former MLB stars and was played during the winter months. The league folded in 1990. All SPBA playoff games were held at Terry Park, since the league's playoffs occurred during spring training.

National Register of Historic Places 
The park pretty much still remained in its 1955 condition. On May 11, 1995 the ball field was placed on the National Register of Historic Places by the United States Department of the Interior. The memorial stadium was dedicated to area resident, Park T. Pigott (1914–1972), in recognition of his lifetime of service, through sports, to the youth of this community. For the 2003 season Terry Park was used by the Eagles of Florida Gulf Coast University while their new ballpark is being built at their Fort Myers campus.

Terry Park Hall of Famers

1925
Al Simmons
Lefty Grove
Jimmie Foxx
Mickey Cochrane
Babe Ruth
Frankie Frisch
Hack Wilson
Travis Jackson
Freddie Lindstrom

1926
George Kelly

1927
Ty Cobb
Eddie Collins
Zach Wheat
Rodgers Hornsby
Jim Bottomley
Dave Bancroft

1928
Tris Speaker
Edd Roush
Rabbit Maranville
Mel Ott.

1929
Grover Cleveland Alexander
Chuck Klein.

1930
George Sisler
Leo Dorocher

1931
Ernie Lombardi

1932
Dizzy Dean
Joe Medwick

1934
Hank Greenberg
Charlie Gehringer
Goose Goslin
Chuck Hafey

Hurricane damage 
In 2004, the stadium was heavily hit by Hurricane Charley with damage from the storm causing the grandstand to be labeled "unsafe". 
Later in the year, The Board of Lee County Commissioners approved a guaranteed maximum price of $701,697 for Compass Construction to tear down the old grandstand and build a new one. But instead of rebuilding the historic 5,000 seat grandstand, the city replaced it with a small 700 seat structure. This was despite the fact the park was given an official historic marker in 1995. Technically once a grandstand is demolished, the ballpark loses all of its historic significance, regardless of whether it is the same field. Only the old girders have been retained as the outline for a new grandstand which opened in 2005. Therefore, what stands at Terry Park now bears little resemblance to the original historical spring training location it once was. While the new grandstand is covered, it is much smaller and made of metal. Many residents felt it was most unfortunate the county decided not to try to save the classic grandstand. 2006 marked the centennial anniversary of Terry Park – at least the playing field portion of it. The new stadium currently seats about 900 people, as the additional bleachers down the foul lines have been removed. A spring training museum is also being considered for the park.

Today 

Today, over 160 college baseball teams from around the country use Terry Park in the month of March to begin their college season. The park is currently part of a multi-diamond facility serving various amateur levels of baseball. The facility sees year-round amateur baseball use. This property is part of the Lee County Multiple Property Submission, a Multiple Property Submission to the National Register.  Terry Park is used year-round for baseball leagues, tournaments, and special events. The facility has four lighted fields with spectator seating including a covered grandstand on the main field. The park is also equipped with batting cages near each field. Terry Park is currently being remodeled with new restrooms, concession area, press box and seating areas. The work will be done in phases to allow the park to operate as close to normal as possible.

In 2020, the Kia Tigers of the Korean Baseball Organisation in South Korea, managed by former Major Leaguer Matt Williams, held spring training at Terry Park, and the team stayed in Fort Myers extended by pandemic restrictions.

References

External links

 Lee County listings at National Register of Historic Places
 Florida's Office of Cultural and Historical Programs
 Lee County listings
 Terry Park Sports Complex
Lee County Parks and Recreation

Grapefruit League venues
Kansas City Royals spring training venues
Minor league baseball venues
National Register of Historic Places in Lee County, Florida
Philadelphia Athletics spring training venues
Pittsburgh Pirates spring training venues
Cleveland Indians spring training venues
Tourist attractions in Fort Myers, Florida
Sports venues in Fort Myers, Florida
Buildings and structures in Fort Myers, Florida
1925 establishments in Florida
Defunct baseball venues in the United States
Defunct minor league baseball venues
Sports venues completed in 1925
Spring training ballparks
Sports venues on the National Register of Historic Places in Florida